City of Asylum (more formally City of Asylum/Pittsburgh) is a nonprofit organization based in Pittsburgh, Pennsylvania, that houses writers exiled from their countries for their controversial writing. It provides them with free housing, health care and access to social services and resettlement in the United States. Their expanded mission involves the Alphabet City venue, Sampsonia Way magazine, and organizing Jazz Poetry Month in Pittsburgh.

Henry Reese and Diane Samuels founded Pittsburgh's City of Asylum in 2004. The organization has a community-based model, with the hopes of integrating the exiled writers into the United States. Exiled writers accepted to the program are granted up to four years of housing. It also gives financial and medical support for their families for two years, giving them ample time and means to adjust to life in the United States.

In November 2016, it became the US headquarters for the International Cities of Refuge Network (ICORN). It was also described as a “model for the world.” City of Asylum hosts more than 175 cultural and literary events every year which are free to the public. In 2017, the organization would repurpose an old masonic lodge into their main headquarters called Alphabet City.

History

Origin and establishment
Pittsburgh couple Henry Reese and Diane Samuels were inspired to create Pittsburgh’s City of Asylum after first hearing Salman Rushdie mention Cities of Asylum in Europe. The couple then asked the Cities of Asylum network in Europe to let them create a Pittsburgh City of Asylum which was eventually approved, making it one of more than 50 similar organizations in the International Cities of Refuge Network.

The couple then bought a former crack house on Sampsonia Way which sits in the Pittsburgh's North Side. They joined the Mattress Factory and Randyland, which are within blocks of one another, to combat blight in the Mexican War Streets that was a result of the decline of the steel industry. Reese and Samuel founded the non-profit through the generous support of friends. This departed from other asylum programs which are typically under institutions such as universities. The original money raised was spent on providing housing, medical benefits and a living stipend for a writer.

The organization’s first author resident was Huang Xiang, a Chinese poet who was placed in death row. Huang Xiang was involved with the Democracy Wall Movement. He and his wife, Zhang Ling were granted asylum in the United States through City of Asylum.

On August 12, 2022, City of Asylum Co-founder Henry Reese was on stage at the time of the Stabbing of Salman Rushdie.  Reese was scheduled to interview Rushdie as he was a inspiration for establishing City of Asylum. Reese suffered lacerations across his face and a black eye from the attack. Reese said "Don’t be intimidated, if anything you should be re-energised by what we have just been through". Further, he stated "You can't give into being silenced."

Writers in Residence 
City of Asylum has housed eight writers-in-exile since 2004. The writers are permitted to stay in apartments owned by the organization. There has been an additional 20 international artist-in-residence writers with shorter stays ranging from one to three months.

Mural Houses 
Huang Xuang wanted to carve a poem into a mountain, inspired by Mt. Washington. Instead, Samuels suggested that he paint the poems outside of the house which he did. He painted Chinese poetry outside the house, earning it the name of House Poem. This later encouraged people to slip notes through the mail slot of poems they had written themselves. The program expanded, and currently 5 City of Asylum houses on Sampsonia Way have murals.

Projects

Alphabet City 
In 2017, City of Asylum added Alphabet City to its network of buildings in Pittsburgh's North Side. The building was a former Masonic Hall and undergone a $12.2 million renovation. It was acquired from the Urban Redevelopment Authority of Pittsburgh in 2015 and construction began in September 2015. The Project received $8 million in tax credits and additional funding from local foundations. Alphabet City currently houses administrative offices, City of Asylum bookstore, and the Brugge on North restaurant. All events held at the space are free.

City of Asylum Books 
City of Asylum Books is a separate entity from non-profit. Located within Alphabet City's building, it is a book store specializing in international and translated literature.

Restaurant 
Alphabet City hosts a restaurant space. Originally it opened with Casellula a Cheese and Wine Cafe. The concept had a strict no-tipping policy. The concept shuttered weeks after staff aired grievances on restaurant industry blog 'Tipped Off'.

Brugge on North, a branch of Pittsburgh restaurants Point Brugge and Park Brugge, operated out of City of Asylum from 2018 - 2020. The current restaurant is called 40 North.

Jazz Poetry Month 
Jazz Poetry was the first event put on by City of Asylum in 2005. It was a collaboration between Huang Xiang and jazz musician Oliver Lake. City of Asylum continued to host Jazz Poetry annually. In 2016, the format changed from a single concert to a full month of concerts.

River of Words 
River of Words is a public art installation by exiled Venezuelan writer and artist resident Israel Centeno. The installation involved a choice of 100 words, all relevant to Pittsburgh, of which Mexican War Street neighbors were invited to display on the wall, door, or window of their houses. The representation of the words were designed by Venezuelan artists Carolina Arnal and Gisela Romero.

Sampsonia Way magazine 
The City of Asylum publishes a magazine called Sampsonia Way which has publishes English translations of exiled writers. The publication's goal is to fight censorship and celebrate free expression in literature.

References

External links

 

Non-profit organizations based in Pittsburgh
Organizations established in 2004
Performing arts in Pittsburgh
Culture of Pittsburgh